Vaughan is an unincorporated community in Nicholas County, in the U.S. state of West Virginia.

History
A post office called Vaughan was established in 1893, and remained in operation until 1958. The community was named after Arthur L. Vaughan, a local merchant who was instrumental in securing the town a post office.

References

Unincorporated communities in Nicholas County, West Virginia
Unincorporated communities in West Virginia